The Ohio-Meadville District is a district of the Unitarian Universalist Association. It comprises 46 congregations in most of Ohio, western Pennsylvania, southwestern New York, and West Virginia; 28 are listed as Welcoming Congregations.

It covers the following clusters:
 Pittsburgh Cluster (Pittsburgh and southwestern PA)
 Northwest PA/NY Cluster (northwest Pennsylvania and southwest New York)
 Cleveland Cluster (greater Cleveland area)
 Northwest Ohio Cluster (northwest Ohio, primarily the area around Toledo)
 WACKY Cluster (mid to eastern Ohio, between Columbus and Cleveland)
 Central OH Cluster (central part of Ohio around Columbus)
 Southern Cluster (West Virginia and southeast Ohio)

External links
 Website

Unitarian Universalist organizations